Snow Cat may refer to:
 Snowcat, a truck-sized tracked snow vehicle
 Tucker Sno-Cat,  a family of tracked vehicles for snow conditions
 Snow leopard, a large cat native to the mountain ranges of central Asia
 Snow Cat (Transformers), a character from the Transformers: Energon cartoon series
Snow Cat, a book by Dayal Kaur Khalsa and an animated adaptation of the same name